Ko Kwang-min may refer to:

Ko Kwang-min (field hockey)
Ko Kwang-min (footballer)

See also
Koo Kwang-ming, Taiwanese statesman, businessman and independence activist